Albury is a village and civil parish in the East Hertfordshire district of Hertfordshire, England, about five miles west of Bishop's Stortford. According to the 2001 census it had a population of 537, increasing in the 2011 Census to 595.

Albury lies between Little Hadham to the south and Furneux Pelham to the north and includes the hamlets Albury End, Clapgate, Patmore Heath and Upwick Green. The 1894–1895 edition of The Comprehensive Gazetteer of England and Wales listed the hamlets:
Albury End, Church End, Clapgate, Gravesend, Patmore Heath, and Upwich. An earlier gazetteer, the Imperial Gazetteer of England and Wales dated 1870–1872 stated that the north-lying Patient-End is an Albury hamlet. Gravesend and Patmore Heath are 400 metres apart. The name "Albury" derives from the Old English ald (old) and burh (fortification).

To the northwest of the village stood Albury Hall, a three-storey manor house believed to have been re-built by MP John Calvert, around 1780 after an earlier house was demolished. Calvert's son, also named John and also an MP, inherited it in 1808, and successive owners modified the house, the army requisitioned it during World War II, and it was demolished around 1950.

There is one public house in Albury, The Catherine Wheel which dates from c.1765. The original building was destroyed by fire in 2004 and a replacement building on the same site reopened in 2007. Historically there were another four public houses in Albury, The Fox at Albury End (closed late 1970s), The Labour in Vain at Church End (closed in the 1950s), The Royal Oak at Clapgate (closed 1985) and Jolly Butchers at Clapgate (closed c.1900).

See also
The Hundred Parishes

Notes

External links

 Albury Village Website
 Boundary Map of Albury AP/CP in 19th and 20th centuries
 photograph of Albury Hall around 1930
 

Villages in Hertfordshire
Civil parishes in Hertfordshire
East Hertfordshire District